In East Asian and Buddhist mythology, Yama or King Yan-lo/Yan-lo Wang, also known as King Yan/Yan Wang, Grandfatherly King Yan, Lord Yan, and Yan-lo, Son of Heaven, is the King of Hell and a dharmapala (wrathful god) said to judge the dead and preside over the Narakas and the cycle of afterlife saṃsāra.

Although based on the god Yama of the Hindu Vedas, the Buddhist Yama has spread and developed different myths and different functions from the Hindu deity.  He has also spread far more widely and is known in most countries where Buddhism is practiced, including China, Korea, Japan, Taiwan, Vietnam, Bhutan, Mongolia, Thailand, Sri Lanka, Cambodia, Myanmar and Laos.

In Theravāda Buddhism
In the Pali canon, the Buddha states that a person who has ill-treated their parents, ascetics, holy persons, or elders is taken upon his death to Yama. Yama then asks the ignoble person if he ever considered his own ill conduct in light of birth, deterioration, sickness, worldly retribution and death. In response to Yama's questions, such an ignoble person repeatedly answers that he failed to consider the karmic consequences of his reprehensible actions and as a result is sent to a brutal hell "so long as that evil action has not exhausted its result."

However, Buddhaghosa considered his rule as a king to be just.

Modern Theravādin countries portray Yama sending old age, disease, punishments, and other calamities among humans as warnings to behave well. At death, they are summoned before Yama, who examines their character and dispatches them to their appropriate rebirth, whether to earth or to one of the heavens or hells. Sometimes there are thought to be two or four Yamas, each presiding over a distinct Hell.

In Chinese, Korean, Vietnamese, and Japanese mythology

In Chinese mythology, Chinese religion, and Taoism, King Yan is the god of death and the ruler of Diyu, overseeing the "Ten Kings of Hell" in its capital of Youdu. He is also known as King Yanluo/Yanluo Wang, a transcription of the Sanskrit for "King Yama" (/). In both ancient and modern times, Yan is portrayed as a large man with a scowling red face, bulging eyes, and a long beard. He wears traditional robes and a judge's cap or a crown which bears the character for "king". He typically appears on Chinese hell money in the position reserved for political figures on regular currency.

According to legend, he is often equated with Yama from Buddhism, but actually, Yanluo Wang has his own number of stories and long been worshiped in China. Yan is not only the ruler but also the judge of the underworld and passes judgment on all the dead. He always appears in a male form, and his minions include a judge who holds in his hands a brush and a book listing every soul and the allotted death date for every life. Ox-Head and Horse-Face, the fearsome guardians of hell, bring the newly dead, one by one, before Yan for judgement. Men or women with merit will be rewarded good future lives or even revival in their previous life. Men or women who committed misdeeds will be sentenced to suffering or miserable future lives. In some versions, Yan divides Diyu into eight, ten, or eighteen courts each ruled by a Yan King, such as King Chujiang, who rules the court reserved for thieves and murderers.

The spirits of the dead, on being judged by Yan, are supposed to either pass through a term of enjoyment in a region midway between the earth and the heaven of the gods or to undergo their measure of punishment in the nether world. Neither location is permanent and after a time, they return to Earth in new bodies.

"Yan" was sometimes considered to be a position in the celestial hierarchy, rather than an individual. There were said to be cases in which an honest mortal was rewarded the post of Yan and served as the judge and ruler of the underworld. Some said common people like Bao Zheng, Fan Zhongyan, Zhang Binglin became the Yan at night or after death.

Drawing from various Indian texts and local culture, the Chinese tradition proposes several versions concerning the number of hells and deities who are at their head. It seems that originally there were two competing versions: 136 hells (8 big ones each divided into 16 smaller ones) or 18 hells, each of them being led by a subordinate king of Yanluo Wang.

They were strongly challenged from the Tang dynasty by a new version influenced by Daoism, which adopted Yanluo Wang to make it the fifth of a set of ten kings (Guardian king-sorter of the ten chambers) each named at the head of a hell by the Jade Emperor. The other nine kings are: Qinguangwang, Chujiangwang, Songdiwang, Wuguanwang, Bianchengwang, Taishanwang, Pingdengwang Dushiwang Zhuanlunwang, typically Taoist names. They compete with Heidi, another Taoist god of the world of the dead. Yanluo Wang remains nevertheless the most famous, and by far the most present in the iconography.

However, then it disappears completely from the list, giving way to a historical figure, a magistrate appointed during his lifetime as judge of the dead by a superior deity. This magistrate is most often Bao Zheng, a famous judge who lived during the Song dynasty. Sometimes he is accompanied by three assistants named "Old Age", "Illness" and "Death".

Yama is also regarded as one of the Twenty Devas or the Twenty-Four Devas, a group of protective Dharmapalas, in Chinese Buddhism.

Some of these Chinese beliefs subsequently spread to Korea, Japan and Vietnam. In Japan, he is called Enma (prev. "Yenma"), King Enma, and Great King Enma. In Korea, Yan is known as Yeom-ra and Great King Yeom-ra'.

 is a superstition in Japan often told to scare children into telling the truth.

A Japanese proverb states . Jizō is typically portrayed with a serene, happy expression whereas Enma is typically portrayed with a thunderous, furious expression. The kotowaza alludes to changes in people's behaviour for selfish reasons depending on their circumstances.

Variable identity
In the syncretic and non-dogmatic world of Chinese religious views, Yanluo Wang's interpretation can vary greatly from person to person. While some recognize him as a Buddhist deity, others regard him as a Taoist counterpart of Bodhisattva Kṣitigarbha. Generally seen as a stern deity, Yanluo Wang is also a righteous and fair Supreme Judge in underworld or skillful advocate of Dharma.

In Tibetan Buddhism

In Tibetan Buddhism Yama occurs in the form of Yama Dharmaraja, also known as Kalarupa, Shinje or Shin Je Cho Gyal (Tibetan: གཤིན་རྗེ་, Gshin.rje). He is both regarded with horror as the prime mover of the cycle of death and rebirth and revered as a guardian of spiritual practice. In the popular mandala of the Bhavachakra, all of the realms of life are depicted between the jaws or in the arms of a monstrous Shinje. Shinje is sometimes shown with a consort, Chamundi, or a sister, Yami, and sometimes pursued by Yamantaka (conqueror of death).

He is often depicted with the head of a buffalo, three round eyes, sharp horns entwined with flame, fierce and angry. In his right hand he often has a stick with a skull and in his left a lasso. On his head he has a crown of skulls. In many depictions he is standing on a recumbent bull crushing a man lying on his back. He is also portrayed with an erect penis.

In popular culture

 In popular 90s manga series YuYu Hakusho, King Yemma (Lord Enma in the manga) (Enma Daiō) is the king of all ogres who judge the dead.
 In the popular bullet hell series Touhou, the final boss of the game Phantasmagoria of Flower View is the character of Eiki Shiki, Yamaxanadu.
 In the anime series Hell Girl, the titular protagonist is called Ai Enma.
 In the manga series Bleach, the captain Commander of the Gotei 13 is called General Genryusai Shigekuni Yamamoto which is based on Yama's name while also fulfilling the same role as him.
 In the One Piece manga series, a legendary Katana was named Enma after the Buddhist King of Hell.
 In the 2012 video game Spelunky, he is the secret Final Boss, located in 5-4 of Hell. Along with him spawn Horse Head and Ox-Face, named after, and inspired by their mythological counterparts.
 In the Yo-kai Watch franchise, Lord Enma is the young ruler of the Yo-kai World, who became ruler after the death of his grandfather Ancient Enma.
 In Naruto Shippuden, the summoned demon by the Naraka Path of Pain is based on Enma.
 In Yakuza 0, Daisaku Kuze's tattoo depicts Enma, the judge and ruler of Hell on his back.
 In the manga and anime series Dragon Ball, the king of Spirit World is called King Yemma.
 In Ojarumaru, one of the antagonists is Great King Enma (officially written as エンマ大王 Enma Daiō). He lives in a mansion at Enma-kai ("Enma World") in the Heian era. He is portrayed as short-tempered, yet kind-hearted. He uses a pink scepter to send the dead to either heaven or a lecture room. During the beginning of the series, Ojarumaru steals Enma's scepter. Enraged, Enma sends the Kooni Trio to retrieve it. While waiting for the oni to return with his scepter, he judges the dead using a book.
 The Yama King is the final boss of the game Shadowrun: Hong Kong. This Yama King is an entity from the astral plane trying to come to earth through a tear between realities under the rebuilt Kowloon Walled City, but is stopped by the team of shadowrunners lead by the protagonist.

See also

Notes

References

Sources

External links 
 

Justice gods
Buddhist gods
Chinese gods
Japanese gods
Death gods
Underworld gods
Dharmapalas
Buddhism and death
Twenty-Four Protective Deities

ja:閻魔